Otis Paul Drayton (May 8, 1939 – March 2, 2010) was an American sprint runner. He was an AAU champion in the  sprint from 1961 to 1963. In 1961, he was a member of the world record of 39.1 seconds setting American 4 × 100 m relay team, and equaled the 200 m world record of 20.5 s in 1962. At the 1964 Olympics, Drayton won a silver medal in the 200 m and ran the opening leg for the gold medal winning American 4 × 100 m relay team, which set a world record at 39.06 seconds.

In retirement Drayton lived with his wife near Cleveland, Ohio, where he worked as deputy project director for the city's Division of Recreation and then at the sheriff's department. He died on March 2, 2010, of a pulmonary embolism following cancer surgery.

References

1939 births
2010 deaths
American male sprinters
World record setters in athletics (track and field)
Athletes (track and field) at the 1964 Summer Olympics
Deaths from cancer in Ohio
Olympic gold medalists for the United States in track and field
Olympic silver medalists for the United States in track and field
Sportspeople from Glen Cove, New York
Track and field athletes from New York (state)
Deaths from pulmonary embolism
Medalists at the 1964 Summer Olympics
Military personnel from New York (state)